KDKW-LD, virtual and UHF digital channel 21, is a low-powered Revenue Frontier-affiliated television station licensed to Lubbock, Texas, United States. The station is owned by DTV America Corporation.

References

External links

DTV America

Television stations in Lubbock, Texas
Low-power television stations in the United States
Television channels and stations established in 2021
Innovate Corp.
2021 establishments in Texas